The following lists events that happened during 2018 in China.

Incumbents

Paramount leader
 General Secretary of the Communist Party – Xi Jinping

Head of state
 President – Xi Jinping
 Vice President – Li Yuanchao →

Head of government
 Premier – Li Keqiang
 Vice Premiers – Zhang Gaoli, Liu Yandong, Wang Yang, Ma Kai →

National legislature
 Congress chairman – Zhang Dejiang →

Political advisory
 Conference chairman – Yu Zhengsheng →

Supervision commission
 Chairman:

Governors
 Governor of Anhui Province – Li Guoying
 Governor of Fujian Province – Tang Dengjie 
 Governor of Gansu Province – Tang Renjian 
 Governor of Guangdong Province – Ma Xingrui 
 Governor of Guizhou Province – Shen Yiqin 
 Governor of Hainan Province – Shen Xiaoming 
 Governor of Hebei Province – Xu Qin
 Governor of Heilongjiang Province – Lu Hao (until March), Wang Wentao (starting May)
 Governor of Henan Province – Chen Run'er
 Governor of Hubei Province – Wang Xiaodong
 Governor of Hunan Province – Xu Dazhe 
 Governor of Jiangsu Province – Wu Zhenglong
 Governor of Jiangxi Province – Liu Qi (politician, born 1957) (until August), Yi Lianhong (starting August)
 Governor of Jilin Province – Liu Guozhong (until 4 January), Jing Junhai (starting 4 January)
 Governor of Liaoning Province – Tang Yijun 
 Governor of Qinghai Province – Wang Jianjun (until August), Liu Ning (starting August)
 Governor of Shaanxi Province – Hu Heping (until 4 January), Liu Guozhong (starting 4 January)
 Governor of Shandong Province – Gong Zheng 
 Governor of Shanxi Province – Lou Yangsheng 
 Governor of Sichuan Province – Yin Li 
 Governor of Yunnan Province – vacant
 Governor of Zhejiang Province – Yuan Jiajun

Events

January 
 January 2 – Shaanxi, Henan, Hubei, Anhui, Jiangsu and other places have been affected by heavy snow or blizzard, which has damaged housing, agriculture and power infrastructure in some areas, and traffic has been blocked.
 January 5 – As of 11:00, Blizzard snow caused 10 deaths in 5 provinces in Central China and East China, more than 567,000 people were affected.

February 
 February 15 – The CCTV Spring Festival Gala, which airs to millions around the country, sparks widespread criticism and faces accusations of racism after featuring a comedy sketch that featured an Asian actress in blackface and with exaggerated buttocks.

March 
 March 5 – 13th National People's Congress was opened.
 March 11 – National People's Congress approves a constitutional change that removes term limits for its leaders, granting General Secretary Xi Jinping the status of "President for life".
 March 28 – North Korea's supreme leader Kim Jong-un met with China's paramount leader Xi Jinping in Beijing on Kim's first reported trip outside the country since taking power.
March – scheduled date for the first plenary session to be held by the 13th National People's Congress

May 
 May 2 – Censorship in China: Chinese authorities have blocked the popular British children's cartoon, Peppa Pig on its Douyin (TikTok) social media service for "subversive" content. The service had over 30,000 viral videos of Peppa Pig on its platform.
 May 8 – former Chinese Communist Party official Sun Zhengcai sentenced to life imprisonment for corruption.

June 
June – planned launch of the lunar exploration mission Chang'e 4.

August 
 August 18 to 19 - Tropical Storm Rumbia caused heavy rain in several province, causing 53 fatalities, including 2 policeman who were washed away by the flood.

September 
 September 15 — the annual routine Air Defense Alert originally scheduled for Guangzhou was cancelled.
 September 16 — Typhoon Mangkhut gradually approached Guangdong. Urban public transportation in Guangzhou and Shenzhen is also affected, in which part of the Guangzhou Metro is out of service; in Shenzhen, buses, subways, and taxis are all out of service, and pure electric taxi charging stations are also closed.
 September 30 — Lanzhou (170) destroyer successfully expelled a US Navy warship "Decatur" destroyer that broke into China's sovereign waters in the South China Sea. The US Navy's "Decatur" destroyer passed through the waters adjacent to the Nanxun Reef, and the Lanzhou (170) destroyer intercepted it. US Pacific Fleet spokesman Charles Brown said in a statement that the Sino-US warships were less than 45 yards away.

October 
 October 3 – The PRC authorities ordered Fan Bingbing and the companies she controls to pay around 883 million yuan (around US$129 million) in taxes, fines, and penalties. She also broke silence on her Weibo account by apologizing for what she had done.

November 
 November 13 — “Great Change – A Large-Scale Exhibition Celebrating the 40th Anniversary of Reform and Opening-up” was grandly opened at the National Museum of the People’s Republic of China. On the afternoon of the same day, Xi Jinping came here to visit the exhibition, reviewing the glorious course of the 40 years of reform and opening up, and proclaiming the firm determination to carry out reform and opening up.

Popular culture

Film
List of Chinese films of 2018

Deaths

January 
2 January – Ye Zhemin, 93, art historian.
9 January
 Guan De, 85, aircraft designer.
 Yuan Chengye, 93, chemist.
16 January – Liu Zhonghua, 101, major general.
17 January – He Yousheng, 86, hydrodynamicist.
18 January – Ding Guangquan, 73, comedian.

February 
1 February – Su Bai, 95, archaeologist.
11 February – Sun Shu, 84, geologist.
12 February – Luo Haocai, 83, politician and legal scholar.
19 February – Zhang Junsheng, 81, optical engineer, politician, and academic administrator. 
24 February – Yang Rudai, 91, politician.
25 February – Dai Fudong, 89, architect.
26 February – Li Boguang, 49, legal scholar and human rights activist.
28 February – Chen Xiaolu, 71, businessman and princeling.

March 
3 March
Lin Hu, 90, air force general.
 Yao Xian, 90, air force general.
7 March – Hao Bailin, 83, physicist.
15 March
 Huang Wenpan, 22, swimmer.
 Ling Yun, 100, politician.
18 March – Li Ao, 82, Chinese-Taiwanese writer and politician

April 
4 April – Li Zhengyou, 82, agronomist and politician, Vice-Governor of Yunnan Province.
7 April
Ai Xing, 93, mechanical engineer.
 Li Zhen, 93, politician, Chairman of the Shandong People's Congress. 
 Wang Wusheng, 73, photographer.
10 April
 Li Dawei, 47, director.
 Li Yaowen, 99, politician, general and diplomat.
 Wu Nansheng, 95, politician.
 Yang Gui, 89, politician, chief designer of the Red Flag Canal.
11 April – Li Tian, 79, aerodynamicist and aircraft designer.
12 April – Hu Chengzhi, 100, palaeontologist and palaeoanthropologist.
16 April – Lü Chuanzan, 85, politician, Chairman of Hebei Provincial People's Congress (1993–1998).
20 April – Nie Bichu, 90, politician.

May 
2 May – Wang Danfeng, 93, actress 
10 May – Wu Dechang, 90, toxicologist.
18 May – Sun Fuling, 96, business executive and politician
19 May – Zhengzhang Shangfang, 84, linguist 
22 May – Lu Chunling, 96, flautist
28 May – Lin Zunqi, 75, physicist and specialist in solid-state laser
30 May – Li Zaiping, 92, molecular biologist

June 
8 June – Liu Jianfu, 100, politician
9 June – Zhang Junzhao, 65, film director and screenwriter (One and Eight, The Shining Arc).
17 June – Zhao Nanqi, 91, general and politician
20 June – Hu Wei, 97, general
21 June – Yan Jizhou, 100, film director
22 June – Ai Weiren, 86, Chinese soldier

July 
2 July – Liu Boli, 87, nuclear chemist.
3 July – Wang Jian, 56, businessman
8 July – Liu Tonghua, 88,  pathologist.
11 July
 Wu Bing'an, 89, ethnologist
 Ji Chunhua, actor (b. 1961)
 Liu Zhenhua, general (b. 1921)
18 July – Ling Li, writer and historian (b. 1942).
26 July – Sha Yexin, 79, playwright
27 July – Song Yuquan, 85, materials scientist.
29 July – Lin Xiangdi, 84, optoelectronic engineer, President of the Southwest University of Science and Technology.
30 July – Zhou Yaohe, 91, materials scientist.
31 July – Su Hongxi, 103, surgeon.

August 
1 August – Cui Xiuwen, artist.
3 August – Zhang Baosheng, 57–58, qigong master.
7 August – Liu Guangding, 88, geologist.
11 August – Li Chaoyi, 84, neurobiologist.
12 August – Ma Jin, 83, geologist.
19 August – Hong Chaosheng, 97, physicist.

September 
1 September – Chen Xian, 98, politician.
7 September
 Chang Baohua, xiangsheng actor (b. 1930).
Yang Side, general (b. 1921)
Sheng Zhongguo, 77, violinist
8 September – Yang Zhenya, 90, diplomat
11 September – Shan Tianfang, pingshu actor (b. 1934).
13 September – Lin Hujia, politician (b. 1916).
15 September – Zhu Xu, 88, actor
16 September
 Min Naiben, 83, physicist and materials scientist.
Wang Guofa, 72, politician
19 September – Buren Bayaer, 58, singer and journalist.
20 September – Wang Mengshu, 79, tunnel and railway engineer
21 September – Xu Delong, 66, materials scientist, President of Xi'an University of Architecture and Technology.
23 September – Liu Jie, 103, politician
28 September
 Zang Tianshuo,  54, musician
Shi Shengjie, 65, xiangsheng comedian

October 
3 October – Fang Nanjiang, 75, novelist and general
5 October – Lin Xiao, politician (b. 1920).
9 October – Lü Junchang, 53, palaeontologist
16 October – Ismail Amat, 83,  politician
18 October – Li Lianda, 84, pharmacologist
20 October – Zheng Xiaosong, 59, politician and diplomat
25 October
 Chen Tiemei, 83, archaeologist
Li Yong, 50, television host
27 October – Yang Ziyuan, 90, politician
29 October
 Wang Guangying, 99, entrepreneur and politician
Li Xifan, 90, literary scholar and redologist.
30 October – Jin Yong, 94, a Chinese wuxia novelist and newspaper founder.
31 October
 Chen Chuangtian, 81, materials scientist
Hou Fusheng, 94, petroleum engineer

November 
4 November – Wang Huanyu, 63, astrophysicist.
6 November – Deng Qidong, 80, geologist.
7 November – Xie Shileng, 83, port and coastal engineer.
10 November – Liu Xuyi, 105, historian.
12 November – Wang Junmin, 63, politician
15 November
 Ba Zhongtan, 88, lieutenant general
Zhang Ting, 96, politician
17 November – Cheng Kaijia, 100, nuclear physicist and engineer.
19 November – Wu Jianchang, 79, engineer and politician
24 November – Shi Jiaonai, 97, plant physiologist
30 November – Chang Guitian, 76, xiangsheng actor

December 
1 December – Zhang Ouying, 43, football player and coach
8 December – Wang Ruilin, 88, general and politician
9 December – Peng Sixun, 99, medicinal chemist
13 December
 Gao Jindian, 79, army officer
Yuan Mu, 90, politician
15 December – Eryue He, 73, writer
19 December – Tömür Dawamat, 91, politician

References

 
2010s in China
Years of the 21st century in China
China
China